Deh-e Ramezan (also Romanized as Deh-e Ramez̤ān; also known as Dehramez̤ān) is a village in Dehdasht-e Sharqi Rural District, in the Central District of Kohgiluyeh County, Kohgiluyeh and Boyer-Ahmad Province, Iran. At the 2006 census, its population was 77, in 14 families.

References 

Populated places in Kohgiluyeh County